The Naiera River is a stream located in Kutch in the Indian state of Gujarat. It flows south into the Arabian Sea.

The Naiera River originates near the Java Vandh village, in the Abdasa Taluka in the Kutch district, and flows southwest. Near the village of Berachiya, it forms a large pond, and then continues along the same trajectory. It drains into the Arabian Sea near the village of Kadoli.

References

External links 
 Naiera River marked on OpenStreetMap, retrieved 20 March 2021.

Rivers of Gujarat
Rivers of India